Staciana Stitts Winfield (born September 12, 1981), née Staciana Stitts, is an American former competition swimmer and breaststroke specialist.  She is a 2000 Summer Olympics and 1999 Pan American Games gold medalist, and 1998 Goodwill Games silver medalist.

Stitts and her University of California, Berkeley teammates Haley Cope, Joscelin Yeo, and Praphalsai Minpraphal broke the 4×50-meter medley relay short-course world record in 2000 with a time of 1:49.23.

In 2004, she graduated from the University of California with a Bachelor of Arts degree.  From 2005 to 2006, Stitts-Winfield worked at the College of Charleston as an assistant swimming coach. In June 2006, Stitts-Winfield was named an assistant swimming coach at University of Southern California (USC).

Stitts-Winfield states, "The life significance of losing my hair at age 12 from alopecia areata has made me a very strong, determined person."  She has been a motivational speaker at the National Alopecia Areata Foundation's Teens Conference Camp and has been a spokesperson for the Children's Alopecia Project.

Family
Stitt's parents, who reside in Encinitas, California are both high school teachers at Carlsbad High School, and she has two brothers, and a sister, Alicia who swam for the University of Iowa. Brother Joseph Stitts swam for University of California, Davis.

She married Brett Winfield.

She has been a resident of Carlsbad, California and Encinitas, California.

See also
 List of Olympic medalists in swimming (women)
 List of University of California, Berkeley alumni

References

External links
 Profile of Staciana Stitts

1981 births
Living people
American female breaststroke swimmers
California Golden Bears women's swimmers
Olympic gold medalists for the United States in swimming
Sportspeople from Columbus, Ohio
Sportspeople from Carlsbad, California
Swimmers at the 1999 Pan American Games
Swimmers at the 2000 Summer Olympics
Swimmers at the 2003 Pan American Games
Medalists at the 2000 Summer Olympics
Pan American Games gold medalists for the United States
Pan American Games medalists in swimming
Competitors at the 1998 Goodwill Games
Medalists at the 1999 Pan American Games
Medalists at the 2003 Pan American Games